Robert MacDonald (1875 – 18 January 1949) was Unionist Party (Scotland) MP for Glasgow Cathcart from 1923 to 1929.

Career
MacDonald was a piano manufacturer. He was a Conservative, sitting on Glasgow City Council from 1914 to 1923, and was a Justice of Peace for the city. He first stood for Parliament in Cathcart in 1922, was elected in 1923 and 1924, and retired in May 1929.

Early life
MacDonald was born in 1875 in Glasgow to William MacDonald, an engineer.

References

External links 
 

Unionist Party (Scotland) MPs
Members of the Parliament of the United Kingdom for Glasgow constituencies
UK MPs 1923–1924
UK MPs 1924–1929
1875 births
1949 deaths
Councillors in Glasgow